Lower Chandler Pond is a  pond in Duxbury and Pembroke, Massachusetts. The pond is located north of Reeds Millpond and south of Upper Chandler Pond. Pine Brook, a tributary of the Jones River, flows through the pond. The water quality has been impaired by non-native aquatic plants and non-native fish in the pond.

External links
Environmental Protection Agency
South Shore Coastal Watersheds - Lake Assessments

Ponds of Plymouth County, Massachusetts
Pembroke, Massachusetts
Duxbury, Massachusetts
Ponds of Massachusetts